Gastroepiploic vein may refer to: 
 Right gastroepiploic vein
 Left gastroepiploic vein